William Hamilton Britton (June 4, 1892 – November 29, 1982) was an American football and basketball coach.  He served as the head football coach at the University of Tennessee for one season in 1935, coaching in the absence of Robert Neyland, who left for active duty in the United States Army.  Britton's career football record was 4–5.  Britton was also the head basketball coach at Tennessee from 1926 to 1935, tallying a mark of 80–73.

After his playing career at the United States Military Academy ended, he was stationed at Fort Shafter in Hawaii, where he served for a season as the head football coach at the University of Hawaii.

Head coaching record

Football

References

External links
 

1892 births
1982 deaths
Army Black Knights football players
Hawaii Rainbow Warriors football coaches
Tennessee Volunteers basketball coaches
Tennessee Volunteers football coaches
Sportspeople from Des Moines, Iowa
Coaches of American football from Iowa
Players of American football from Des Moines, Iowa
Basketball coaches from Iowa
Military personnel from Iowa